The Kimbu are a Bantu ethnolinguistic group from Chunya District of Mbeya Region, Tanzania.  In 1987 the Kimbu population was estimated to number 78,000.

References

Ethnic groups in Tanzania
Indigenous peoples of East Africa